Hale Common is a farming hamlet on the Isle of Wight. Hale Common is northeast of Bathingbourne and northwest of Branstone. It is in the civil parish of Godshill.

Overview 

Hale Common features "The Fighting Cocks" pub. There is a strawberry farm in Hale Common, called Hollands Strawberry Farm. Hollands Strawberry Farm has a shop, and also allows people to pick their own strawberries.

There are two fishing lakes in Hale Common, called the Hale Manor lakes.  One is available for those who purchase a "day ticket" and the other allows fishing by those members of a syndicate. These lakes are the site of a wetland restoration project by the Royal Society for the Protection of Birds.

Hale Common also is the site of a car dealership and service station. There are several other businesses in Hale Manor, including other farms, and engineering, concrete and construction services.

References

External links
Map of Hale Common location

Villages on the Isle of Wight